Hicks Creek may refer to:

Hicks Creek (Santa Clara County), a stream in Santa Clara County, California
Hicks Creek (Susquehanna River), a stream in Luzerne County, Pennsylvania
Hicks Creek (Texas), a stream in Bandera County